Burgruine Reifenstein is a castle in Styria, Austria, situated close to the village of Pöls.

History 
The castle was most likely built in the 12th century by the Reifenstein family, a branch of the House of Liechtenstein and further expanded in the 13th and 14th century. During the 15th century, the castle changed ownership several times, before being sold in 1521 to Sebald Pögl from Thörl, who rebuilt it in the Renaissance style. Finally, in 1698, the castle changed owners one last time, coming into the possession of the Schwarzenberg family, who own it to this day, along with the surrounding forest.

The castle remained inhabited until 1809 when, in order to avoid French troops being quartered there during the Napoleonic Wars, the roof was removed, which led to an accelerated rate of decay.

Today 
Several trails that lead to the castle ruins are maintained.

See also
List of castles in Austria

References

This article was initially translated from the German Wikipedia.

Castles in Styria